The Prussian National Assembly (German: Preußische Nationalversammlung), came into being after the revolution of 1848 and was tasked with drawing up a constitution for Prussia. It first met in the building of the Sing-Akademie zu Berlin (later the Maxim Gorki Theater). On 5 November 1848 the Government ordered the expulsion of the Prussian National Assembly to Brandenburg an der Havel and on 5 December 1848 it was dissolved by royal decree.

Elections and task of the National Assembly 
The main goal of King Frederick William IV and the liberal March Ministry under Ludolf Camphausen in calling elections to the National Assembly was to steer the often spontaneous and unpredictable revolutionary movement into controllable channels by legalizing it. The reconvened United Diet decided on an "agreement [of the parliament with the king] of the Prussian constitution" as the goal of the coming National Assembly. This thus expressly forbade an independent draft by Parliament.

The electoral law provided for universal, equal, and indirect suffrage. All men over the age of 24 who had lived in their place of residence for more than six months and did not receive poor relief had the right to vote. No larger German state had a similarly broad electoral franchise as Prussia. The primary elections took place on May 1, 1848 (at the same time as those for the German National Assembly). The electors thus determined decided the composition of the parliament on May 8 and 10, 1848.

Composition 
The composition of the parliament differed significantly from that of the Frankfurt National Assembly. Professors as well as freelance lawyers were poorly represented in Berlin; journalists, full-time publicists or writers were completely absent. Unlike in Frankfurt, Berlin's deputies included artisans, farmers (46) and large landowners (27). Judges were also more strongly represented than in Frankfurt. Similar to Frankfurt, however, public servants in the broadest sense (including teaching, administration and the judiciary) made up the largest number of members.

Overall, the National Assembly in Berlin was much more dominated by the lower middle class and less by the educated bourgeoisie than the assembly in Frankfurt. The fact that the better-known personalities in the constituencies tended to be sent to Frankfurt played a role. By contrast, the Berlin deputies were considered closer to the people.

References

External links
Prussian Assembly

Politics of Prussia
German revolutions of 1848–1849
1848 establishments in Prussia
1848 disestablishments in Prussia
1848 in politics